Wang Shasha (born January 8, 1987) is a female Chinese handball player who competed at the 2004 Summer Olympics.

In 2004, she finished eighth with the Chinese team in the women's competition. She played all seven matches and scored 25 goals.

References

External links
Profile

1987 births
Living people
Handball players at the 2004 Summer Olympics
Handball players at the 2008 Summer Olympics
Olympic handball players of China
Chinese female handball players
Sportspeople from Yantai
Handball players from Shandong
Asian Games medalists in handball
Handball players at the 2006 Asian Games
Handball players at the 2010 Asian Games
Asian Games gold medalists for China
Medalists at the 2010 Asian Games